Time Stood Still may refer to:

Time Stood Still (film), Oscar-nominated 1956 travelogue film
Time Stood Still, 1985 album from Vern Gosdin discography
"Time Stood Still", song by Bad English
"Time Stood Still", song by Madonna for the soundtrack of The Next Best Thing
"Time Stood Still", song by Todd Rundgren from No World Order
"Time Stood Still", song by Somesh Mathur

See also
Time Stands Still (disambiguation)
"When Time Stood Still", a song from the 1981 album Time (Electric Light Orchestra album)
Where Time Stood Still, an isometric 3D arcade adventure game released by Ocean in 1988